Gonolobus barbatus  is a species of plant in the family Apocynaceae that is native to Campeche, Mexico.

References

External links
 
 

barbatus